The 2021–22 Premier League Cup was the eighth edition of the competition. The defending champions, Everton, who won the 2018–19 competition, were eliminated in the group stage. The previous two editions of the competition were cancelled, or not completed due to the COVID-19 pandemic in the United Kingdom.

Participants

Category 1
Arsenal
Birmingham City
Blackburn Rovers
Burnley
Derby County
Everton
Leeds United
Middlesbrough
Newcastle United
Norwich City
Nottingham Forest
Reading
Southampton
Stoke City
Sunderland
West Bromwich Albion
West Ham United
Wolverhampton Wanderers

Category 2 
Charlton Athletic
Colchester United
Fulham
Peterborough United
Queens Park Rangers
Sheffield United
Swansea City
Watford
Wigan Athletic

Category 3 
AFC Bournemouth
Exeter City
Huddersfield Town
Mansfield Town
Oxford United
Plymouth Argyle
Southend United
Stevenage

Category 4 
Salford City

Qualifying round 
A qualifying round was required to finalise the 32 teams that would enter the Group Stage.

Group stage 
The draw for the group stage took place on 25 August 2021. Teams play each other twice, with the group winners and runners–up advance to the round of 16.

Group A

Group B

Group C

Group D

Group E

Group F

Group G

Group H

Knockout stages

Round of 16 
The draw for the round of 16 took place on 1 March 2022.

Quarter–final 
The quarter-final draw was confirmed on 21 March 2022.

Semi–final 
The semi-final draw was announced on 26 April 2022.

Final 
The final details were announced on 6 May 2022, with West Bromwich Albion being picked as the home team.

 

 

|-
|colspan=4|Substitutes:
|-
 
 
 
 

|-
|colspan=4|Coach:  Deon Burton
|-

 

 

|-
|colspan=4|Substitutes:
|-
 
 
 
 

|-
|colspan=4|Coach:  Jamie Collins
|-

See also 
 2021–22 Professional U23 Development League
 2021–22 FA Youth Cup

References 

2021–22 in English football
Premier League Cup (football)